Rising Stars Philippines is a Philippine reality karaoke - based singing competition airing on TV5 starting last March 14, 2015 at 10pm. A singing contest wherein judges are told what to do and ask them choose risingstar's bet, That's why Mr. Jimmy Bondoc left the show because of that. It was a local contest before it was finally aired on television. Before they roam around the country, having booth inside the malls and online auditions were added as well, to find the best online singing sensation from all around the country. The selected finalists soon were revealed through online Voting, (Judges choice, Top voter & best performance). The finalists will then have a mall show where the winners will be revealed. Until it was famous enough to be launched, Venus Raj and Ogie Alcasid take the role as the hosts of the show. Jaya and Papa Jack served as casual judges and Nina, and Jimmy Bondoc as guest judges. Jimmy Bondoc was an official casual judge until he left due to personal reasons. Anna Feliciano served as the show's coach. On the finale, Ms. Gwen Albarracin, the President and CEO of the Center for Pop and Ms. Wilma Galvante, the Chief Entertainment Content Officer of TV5 served as guest judges. The network initially planned to air the program on both Saturday and Sunday nights at 9pm. But due to the network's crowded Sunday lineup, Rising Stars instead aired on Saturday nights only, moving Call Me Papa Jack to Sundays at 10pm.

The 16-year-old Rocelle Solquillo eventually won the first season for winning 3 straight weeks and closely defeating Krezia Mae Tonacao, Lee'Anna Layumas who came 3rd and Remy Luntayao who came 4th respectively.

Format
The Auditions were held around the Philippines, from Metro Manila to Mindanao. No age limit were required to join, as long as contestants can sing and have a 'rising star' quality. A recording booth like studio were scattered around the country known as the Audition caravan is the venue of the auditions. Auditions were also available through a website and a mobile application. In mobile application auditions, an auditioner must download the risingstars mobile karaoke and use it while singing and recording themselves from it. The Auditioner's song piece performance on the booth are posted on an online website, where public can vote, and choose the top performers. The one's who get Judge's stars and the one's with the most votes go into the mall shows where in they will fight for the top 3 spots. If they won the top 3 spots from the (10 mall shows overall, and 5 contestants were picked from online/mobile app) mall shows, they will advance on the live semifinals on television. Among all the contestants, 35 lucky singing aspirants were selected to be on the show through online auditions and auditions around the country. Every week contestants will face different challenges. Contestants will sing on the live stage with the judges and audience in front of them. after they sing, they will be called one by one and they will be informed if they had made it to the top 16. On the top 8 of the show, they had launched a new twist, where in a contender will challenge a Finalist to take a spot on his/her slot.

Prizes
The winner will receive 500,000 pesos worth of gift certificates, Smart talk & text freebies, 100,000 worth of beauty products and services from Jancen Clinic and the Vine aesthetics, a free tuition at center for pop school and a trip to Hong Kong and a recording contract. the runner-up also receive same prizes, 250,000 pesos and 50,000 worth of beauty products and services, as well as the 3rd placer got 100,000 pesos and 25,000 worth of beauty products and services.

Top 35
Avel Grace Molles
Chiastina Perez - (Online winner)
Christian Amata
Lucas Garcia - (Online Winner)
Joselito Gustilo
Nikki Love Dumalagan
Ronnie Sarucam
Jestonie Divino
Rochelle Newbold
Ruby Cabudoy
Rochelle Solquillo
Kurt Espiritu
Lee'Anna Layumas
Rochelle Marie Ubay-Ubay
Mark Guile Las Pinas
Ryan Royce Faigao
Nesteer Ernz Macan
Tricia Louise Sianson
Samantha Hoberg
Mia Barbra Derilo
Marichar Labado - (Online Winner)
Dave Alcano
Kristian Luke Vargas
Karl Zarate
Remy Luntayao
Fatima Valenzona
PFC Donna Macopia
PFC Aiza Moreno
Robert Cozma
Jake Diaz - (Online Winner)
Danielle Najarro
Victoria Ingram - (Online Winner)
Julienne Mae Mora
Duane David
Krezia Mae Tonacao
Wilbert Hermosada

Top 16
Chiastine Faye 'Cha' Perez - 25, Laguna
Mia Barbra 'Barbie' Derilo - 27, Iloilo
Dave Alcano - 21, Cebu
Duane David - 19, Batangas
Joselito 'Bon' Gustillo Jr - 28, Manila
Karl Zarate - 21, Manila
Krezia Mae Tonacao - 13, Metro Manila
Lee'Anna Justine Weber Layumas - 22, Bacolod
Lucas Nicco Garcia - 16, Batangas
Remy Luntayao - 15, Laguna
Robert D. 'Rob' Cozma - 48, Dagupan
Rocelle Jeanne R. Solquillo - 16, Bacolod
Ronnie 'Roni' Sarucam - 13, Davao
Samantha 'Sam' Hoberg - 16, Iloilo
Victoria Ingram - 18, Cebu
PFC Virna Liza 'Aiza' Moreno - 28, Nueva Ecija

Challengers
Alliyah Cadeliña - 15, Manila
She was chosen to battle one of the finalists. Hoping to get into the top 8 and in the competition, she challenged Le'Anna Layumas with the song Girl on Fire but she did not won the battle, with Lee'Anna still secured on her spot in the top 8.

Victoria Ingram - 18, Cebu
She among with two other eliminated contestants Jestonie and Kurt were brought back, after getting the highest votes in challenge-a-star online. but only Victoria was chosen. She challenged Barbie Derilo, with the song Iris. In the end, Victoria beat Barbie in a close fight, securing herself in the top 6.

Elimination chart

Contestants who appeared on other talent shows
 Remy Luntayao was a part of the group Luntayao Family who was a finalist on Pilipinas Got Talent
 Karl Zarate was a finalist on Pop Star Kids

References

External links

Philippine reality television series
TV5 (Philippine TV network) original programming
2015 Philippine television series debuts
2015 Philippine television series endings
Filipino-language television shows